Humphry is a masculine given name and surname. It comes from the Old Germanic name Hunfrid, which means "friend of the hun". The name may refer to:

People

First name
Humphry Berkeley (1926–1994), British politician
Humphry Bowen (1929–2001), British botanist and chemist
Humphry Davy (1778–1829), British scientist
Humphry Ditton (1675–1715), British mathematician
Humphry Garratt (1898–1974), British cricket player
Humphry Knipe (born 1941), South African writer
Humphry Legge, 8th Earl of Dartmouth (1888–1962), British police officer
Humphry Marshall (1722–1801), American botanist
Humphry Morice (1671–1731), British banker 
Humphry Osmond (1917–2004), British psychiatrist
Humphry Repton (1752–1818), British landscape designer 
Humphry Rolleston (1862–1944), British physician
Thomas Humphry Ward (1845–1926), British writer
Humphry William Woolrych (1795–1871), British lawyer and writer

Surname
C.E. Humphry (1854–1925), British journalist
Derek Humphry (born 1930), American writer
George Humphry (1816–1867), British cricketer
George Murray Humphry (1820–1896), British doctor and writer
Jay Humphry  (born 1948), Canadian figure skater
Ozias Humphry (1742–1810), British painter
William Gilson Humphry (1815–1886), British clergyman

Fiction
Humphry Clinker, fictional character in the novel The Expedition of Humphry Clinker by Tobias Smollett

See also 
Humfrey, given name and surname
Humphery, surname
Humphrey, a more common spelling
Humphreys (surname)
Humphries, surname
Humphrys, surname

Masculine given names